Rank and file may refer to:
A military term relating to the horizontal "ranks" (rows) and vertical "files" (columns) of individual foot-soldiers, exclusive of the officers
A term derived from the above used to refer to enlisted troops, as opposed to the officers
Rank and file (chess), the rows and columns on a chessboard
The individual members of a political organization or labour union, exclusive of its leadership
Rank and file movement, a blanket term for informal, Trotskyist militant groups among British trade unionists, generally strenuously opposed to the union hierarchies and often facing expulsion by them
Rank and File Movement, a militant movement which grew within the Amalgamated Association of Iron and Steel Workers in the United States in 1934
Rank and File (band), an American cowpunk band
"The Rank and File" (Playhouse 90), a 1959 American television play
"The Rank and File" (Play for Today), a 1971 BBC television play written by Jim Allen and directed by Ken Loach
A variation of Forty Thieves (card game)